Kalabra (Beraur) is a Papuan language of the Bird's Head Peninsula of New Guinea. It is closest to Tehit. Kalabra is spoken in Beraur District, Sorong Regency, West Papua.

References

Languages of western New Guinea

West Bird's Head languages